Hamsa Nandini (born Poonam Bartake) is an Indian model, dancer, and actress known for her works in Telugu cinema. She has modeled for MaaStars magazine, Celebrity Cricket League, and Hyderabad International Fashion week 2011 and 2013. Her birth name is Poonam, under which she appeared in her first few films, but since there were too many people named Poonam in the film industry, director Vamsy rechristened her Hamsa Nandini. In 2015, she played the warrior princess Madanika in the Telugu historical Rudhramadevi. She mainly appears in item numbers in Telugu film industry.

Early life
Hamsa Nandini was born and brought up in Pune. Later she moved to Mumbai to become a model . She has been in the modeling industry since 2002, and has modeled for MaaStars magazine, Celebrity Cricket League, Hyderabad International Fashion week 2011 & 2013, and various television commercials. She graduated in commerce and had enrolled in a PG (postgraduate) course in human resources in 2009.

Item numbers
In 2013, all her four releases, Mirchi, Bhai, Atharintiki Daaredi and Ramayya Vasthavayya featured her in item numbers. She stated that she was happy "doing a five-minute dance number" as it gives her "phenomenal reach" and "a good platform to reach out to the masses". Most recently she performed a special number in Legend.

Filmography

References

External links
 
 

1984 births
21st-century Indian actresses
Actresses from Pune
Actresses in Hindi cinema
Actresses in Kannada cinema
Actresses in Tamil cinema
Actresses in Telugu cinema
Female models from Maharashtra
Indian film actresses
Living people
Marathi people